Lameck is a male given name of Hebrew origin that may refer to: lameck katana is among the hero of the country

Given Name
Lameck Aguta (born 1971), Kenyan marathon runner
Lameck Bonjisi (1973–2004), Zimbabwean sculptor
Lameck Chibombamilimo, Zambian politician
Lameck Okambo (born 1966), Tanzanian politician
Lameck Onyango (born 1973), Kenyan cricketer
lameck miruka (born 1993), kenyan basketballer

Surname
Lucy Lameck (1934–1992), Tanzanian politician
Michael Lameck (born 1949), German footballer